Rohan Wight (born 30 January 1997) is an Australian professional racing cyclist. He rode in the men's team pursuit event at the 2017 UCI Track Cycling World Championships.

Major results

2013
 3rd Time trial, National Novice Road Championships
2014
 1st  Team pursuit, Oceania Junior Track Championships
 National Junior Track Championships
1st  Omnium
1st  Team pursuit
 3rd  Time trial, Oceania Junior Road Championships
2015
 UCI Juniors Track World Championships
1st  Madison
1st  Team pursuit
2nd  Omnium
 1st  Time trial, National Junior Road Championships
 1st  Team pursuit, National Junior Track Championships
 Oceania Track Championships
2nd  Individual pursuit
2nd  Team pursuit
2016
 2nd Madison, National Track Championships
2017
 1st  Team pursuit, UCI Track Cycling World Championships
 2nd  Madison, Oceania Track Championships
 National Track Championships
2nd Team pursuit
3rd Madison
2018
 1st  Madison, National Track Championships

References

External links
 

1997 births
Living people
Australian male cyclists
Place of birth missing (living people)
UCI Track Cycling World Champions (men)
Australian track cyclists
20th-century Australian people
21st-century Australian people